Marc Prosper Jacques Arthur Benoît-Lizon (1 November 1921 – 17 September 1950) was a French skier. He competed in the military patrol at the 1948 Summer Olympics. He was killed during the First Indochina War.

Personal life
Benoît-Lizon served as a master sergeant in the 3rdE REI, French Foreign Legion during the First Indochina War. He commanded a partisan unit during the Battle of Đông Khê, and was severely wounded during the battle. He was bayoneted and killed by Viet Minh troops soon after.

References

1921 births
1950 deaths
Sportspeople from Jura (department)
French military patrol (sport) runners
Military patrol competitors at the 1948 Winter Olympics
French military personnel of the First Indochina War
French military personnel killed in the First Indochina War
Winter Olympics competitors for France
Soldiers of the French Foreign Legion
Olympians killed in warfare